Pointes et plages de Saziley et Charifou (Points and beaches of Salizey and Charifou) is a protected area in Mayotte, a French island territory in the Comoro archipelago of the western Indian Ocean. It was established in 1997.

Description
The protected area includes Point Saziley, the south-easternmost headland of the island, and adjacent areas. Point Saziley is 4 km long with a sharp ridge rising to 233 m and is vegetated with dry shrubland and thicket containing baobabs (Adansonia digitata). The protected area also includes the beaches and mangroves of Dapani and Charifou west of Point Salizey. The adjacent sea is part of Mayotte Marine Natural Park.

Wildlife
The area supports populations of Comoros olive pigeon (Columba pollenii), Comoros blue pigeon (Alectroenas sganzini), Mayotte white-eye (Zosterops mayottensis), Mayotte sunbird (Cinnyris coquerellii) and red-headed fody (Foudia eminentissima). It is also home to Robert Mertens's day geckos (Phelsuma robertmertensi), island day geckos (Phelsuma nigristriata) and Pasteur's day geckos (Phelsuma v-nigra pasteuri). Its beaches are a nesting site for green, and probably hawksbill, sea turtles.

Together with Mont Choungui to the west, it forms the 1600 ha Mlima Choungui and Sazilé or Crêtes du Sud Important Bird Area (IBA), as identified as such by BirdLife International.

References

Protected areas of Mayotte
Important Bird Areas of Mayotte
1997 establishments in Mayotte